The Twinings Museum is a small museum adjacent to the Twinings shop at 216, Strand, in London, England.

History
Thomas Twining moved with his family from Gloucester to London in 1684, when he was nine years old.  After serving an apprenticeship as a weaver in the City of London, Twining worked for the East India Company merchant Thomas D'Aeth, and became a tea merchant.

Twining purchased Tom's Coffee Shop, in Devereux Court, off the Strand, in 1706. He subsequently used the premises to sell tea to customers, in addition to the more common coffee, and to sell dry tea to both customers and other nearby coffee shops, such as the Grecian Coffee House -  now the site of The Devereux public house - and George's Coffee House across Devereux Court. Tea was then an expensive luxury product. Twining's business was quickly successful, which enabled Twining to expand into adjacent premises on the Strand. By 1717, Twining was trading at 216 Strand, at the sign of the Golden Lyon, where the business remains.  The classical door case is surmounted by a pediment with a statue of a golden lion, and two figures of Chinese men who signify the origin of the beverage. The Twining business expanded in 1825 to include a bank that financed tea trading, which operated at 215 Strand from 1835 until it merged with Lloyds Bank in 1892.

The tea business became known as "R. Twining" after Robert Twining became its director in 1771. Twinings received a Royal Warrant from Queen Victoria in 1837. The Royal Warrant is displayed at the museum. The museum also displays vintage tea caddies, examples of Twinings packaging, and other tea memorabilia and ephemera.  The museum explains the history of the Twinings family.  

The Twinings tea business is now owned by Associated British Foods.

Exhibits
The Twinings Museum contains historical artifacts and documents associated with the history of the Twinings company, including advertisements, a copy of the royal warrant for providing Twinings to British Royalty, tea caddies, and historic packaging materials

See also

 List of food and beverage museums

References

 History of Twinings, twinings.co.uk
 The Strand - Britains Original Tea Room, twinings.co.uk
 Twinings, hidden-london.com
  Walter Thornbury, "The Strand (southern tributaries)", in Old and New London: Volume 3 (London, 1878), pp. 63–84. British History Online

External links
Twinings website

Tea museums
Museums in the City of Westminster
Biographical museums in London
Food museums in the United Kingdom
Tea in the United Kingdom
Grade II listed buildings in the City of Westminster